Srbui Stepanova Lisitsian (June 28, 1893 in Tiflis - 1979) was an Armenian-Soviet ethnographer known for her development of a novel mathematical method for describing folk dance precisely using film techniques. Lisitsian spent her career at the Armenian Institute of Archeology and Ethnology as an ethnologist, after earning her Ph.D. at the Armenian Institute of History. In 1980, the Armenian Institute of Archeology and Ethnology was renamed after her and her father, another noted ethnologist.

Biography 
Srbuhi Lisitsyan was born in 1893 in Tbilissi in the family of Stepan Lisitsyan, a pedagogue and ethnographer. His mother, Ekaterina Kristaporovna, was also a pedagogue.

Srbuhi's parents published the children's magazine "Hasker" (1905–1922), edited the "Taraz" weekly (1892-1893) and collaborated with prominent figures of Armenian culture: Hovhannes Tumanyan, Avetik Isahakyan, Alexander Shirvanzade, Ghazaros Aghayan, Hovhannes Hovhannisyan, L. With George Bashinjaghyan, Panos Terlemezyan, Yeghishe Tadosyan and others.

She is graduating from the Garye Girls' Higher Courses in Moscow with a degree in Russian-Roman literature. E. Ozarovskaya "Artistic Speech" studio, I. Chernetskaya Dance Studio.

Activity 
Lisitsyan returned to Tbilisi in 1917, where his organizational talent appeared. In the same year he founded a studio of recitation, rhythm and plastic, which in 1924 was transformed into the Rhythm Institute of Tbilisi.

In 1930 Lisitsyan settled in Yerevan. Due to his efforts, the "Rhythm, Plastics and Physical Culture" College (later "Rhythm and Plastics Studio") was opened in Yerevan in the same year. He manages the ethnographic ensemble of students և studio. With his direct participation, a dance school was opened in 1936. Lisitsyan becomes the first director of the college.

From 1930 he began to write folk dances - theatrical performances (plays). Lisitsyan's notes and theoretical analysis of Armenian folk dances were not only the first in the history of Armenian dance, but also had a fundamental significance.

The next height of Srbuhi Lisitsyan's activity was the creation of a movement recording system. By studying the writing systems that existed before, he reveals, takes into account all the shortcomings of his predecessors, appropriates all that is valuable. In 1940, Lisitsyan's work "Movement Record (Cinematography)" was published in Moscow, which was a logical continuation of the systems created before that.

The new method made it possible to easily analyze the movement in completely different ways on each count of the device. Thanks to the invention of Lisitsyan's movement, an eagle was created, where the number of dances now stands at more than 3,000. Srbuhi Lisitsyan was the first in the history of dance to bring to life the modern principle of writing, due to which the texts of movement, verbal, musical and imagery are brought to light, the linguistic, historical and geographical layers are revealed.

Lisitsyan is the founder of artistic gymnastics in Transcaucasia. During the scientific expeditions he registered Armenian folk dances, theatrical actions, collected ethnographic and folklore materials. Author of articles, works և translations, dance performances. He wrote the "Narine" ballet (with M. Barkhudaryan). Translated from Russian works of Armenian classics (L. Shant, At. Zoryan, R. Remirchyan) etc.

References 

Women ethnologists
Armenian ethnologists
Soviet ethnographers
Armenian women scientists
20th-century women scientists
1893 births
1979 deaths
20th-century Armenian women
Soviet women scientists
Soviet Armenians
Georgian people of Armenian descent
Scientists from Tbilisi
People from Tiflis Governorate